Dorothea Austin Banner (1921 – 25 June 2011) was an Austrian-born American pianist and composer who specialized in electronic and computer generated music.

Biography
Austin was born Dorothea Blaukopf into a Jewish family in Vienna, Austria. As a child, she was already performing as a concert pianist. She fled to England before World War II on the last Kindertransport sponsored by the Red Cross. Her brother Viktor and her parents died during the war.

In England she worked at a factory for a while to support herself, but was eventually taken in by Quaker philanthropists Nelly and Rachel Leighton. She studied piano at the Royal College of Music and the Royal Academy of Music with Tobias Matthay in London, and afterward worked as a concert pianist.

She married Dr. Hermann Augapfel (Harry Austin), who was held during the war in a British camp for foreigners from enemy countries. She began serving as a piano teacher at that time, and continued this work after the couple emigrated to the United States in 1949. The Austins settled in Valley Stream, Long Island, where they lived until Harry Austin died in 1974.

As her performing career had been interrupted by the war, Austin attended Queens College (CUNY) in New York City, where she studied composition with Leo Kraft and George Perle. She developed an interest in electronic forms and composition with synthesizer, working successfully as a composer. Austin took a position as professor at Queensborough Community College, where she remained for nearly forty years, also serving as department chair. Austin was a member of the New York Women Composers Association.

After the death of Harry Austin, she married Gerson Banner, who died in 2004. Austin had three daughters. Her papers are stored at Queensborough Community College Library.

Selected works
 Transformation for viola, piano and tape (1973)
 Fantasia for piano and orchestra (1984)
 Syndetos for piano (1984)
 Analogy for viola, cello and piano (1985)
 Metamorphosis for cello and piano (1986)
 Reflections I
 Reflections II for high voice, flute (piccolo), oboe (English horn), clarinet, horn and bassoon; words by Stephen Crane

Notes

References

External links
 Dorothea Austin Banner obituary with photograph

1921 births
2011 deaths
20th-century classical composers
21st-century classical composers
American women classical pianists
American classical pianists
American women classical composers
American classical composers
Austrian classical composers
Austrian classical pianists
Jewish American classical composers
21st-century American composers
20th-century classical pianists
Queensborough Community College faculty
People from Valley Stream, New York
20th-century American women pianists
20th-century American pianists
20th-century American composers
21st-century American women pianists
21st-century American pianists
20th-century women composers
21st-century women composers
Austrian emigrants to the United States
21st-century American Jews